Itzkovitch Synagogue is a shtiebel in central Bnei Brak.

History
Itzkovitch Synagogue is one of the most active synagogues in the world, with prayer services taking place around the clock in multiple rooms. There are an average 17,000 visitors a day. The synagogue is named for Zvi Itzkovitch, the original owner of the house, who wanted to stop traffic passing by his home on Shabbat. He took advantage of a law requiring that streets containing synagogues be closed on Shabbat by declaring one room in his house a synagogue.

References

Orthodox synagogues in Israel
Buildings and structures in Tel Aviv District
Bnei Brak